is a Japanese former Nippon Professional Baseball pitcher. He played for the Yomiuri Giants from 1984 to 2001. He won the Eiji Sawamura Award three times, 1989, 1995, and 1996, and he won the Nippon Professional Baseball Most Valuable Player Award in 1990.

See also
 Masumi Kuwata
 Hiromi Makihara

External links
Career statistics and player information from Baseball-Reference

1965 births
Living people
Baseball people from Saitama Prefecture
Japanese baseball players
Nippon Professional Baseball pitchers
Yomiuri Giants players
Nippon Professional Baseball MVP Award winners
Japanese baseball coaches
Nippon Professional Baseball coaches
Japanese Baseball Hall of Fame inductees
People from Kawaguchi, Saitama